Luhuo County is a county of Sichuan Province, China. It is under the administration of the Garzê Tibetan Autonomous Prefecture.

History
On March 24, 1923, a magnitude 7.3 earthquake struck between Luhuo and Dawu and killed 4800 people. 

On February 6, 1973, a magnitude 7.6 earthquake occurred near Zhaggo, a town in the county.

Towns and Townships 

 Xindu Town
 Simu Town
 Zhuwei Town
 Niba Township
 Yade Township
 Luoqiu Township
 Yimu Township
 Renda Township
 Dandu Township
 Chonggu Township
 Gengzhi Township
 Kaniang Township
 Chongta Township
 Zongmai Township
 Shangluokema Township
 Xialuokema Township

Climate

References

Populated places in the Garzê Tibetan Autonomous Prefecture
County-level divisions of Sichuan